Jam Dam, is an earthfill dam on Jam river near Katol, Nagpur district in state of Maharashtra in India.

Specifications

Purpose
 Irrigation

See also
 Dams in Maharashtra
 List of reservoirs and dams in India

References

Dams in Nagpur district
Dams completed in 1996
1996 establishments in Maharashtra